24 Hours in the Life of a Woman is a 1968 French-West German drama film directed by Dominique Delouche, based on the novella Twenty-Four Hours in the Life of a Woman by Stefan Zweig. It was listed to compete at the 1968 Cannes Film Festival, but the festival was cancelled due to the events of May 1968 in France. The book on which the film is based had previously been adapted as 24 Hours of a Woman's Life in 1952, and was later adapted as 24 Hours in the Life of a Woman in 2002.

Plot
In Monte Carlo, the 42-year-old widow Alice observes a young man with a frightening passion for gambling, who completely ruins himself in the casino. She saves Thomas from suicide and spends a night in a hotel with him in a frenzy of helpful pity. In the morning, Alice reacts with shame and horror. Anxious to bring the matter to a good conclusion, she meets again during the day with the young man, who now, with overflowing gratitude, venerates her like a maternal saint. In German, Thomas quotes the first stanza of the poem "Du meine Seele, du mein Herz" ("You, my soul. You, my heart") by Friedrich Rückert. And that is what hurts this woman and awakens in her more than motherly love. She secretly prepares to leave on the same train with Thomas and to stay with him. When she finally reaches the station, the train has already left. And her disappointment at having lost him as a man is joined by an even more bitter one: when she enters the casino again, looking for memories, her protégé, who had fervently renounced gambling even in a church, is playing with the money advanced by Alice for his trip home. Worse still, he gives it back to her in a wild riot of a temporary win and deeply humiliates her in front of all the casino guests.

Cast
 Danielle Darrieux as Alice
 Robert Hoffmann as Thomas
 Romina Power as Mariette
 Léna Skerla as Mademoiselle Georges
  as Madame Di Stefano
  as Le pianiste
 Helga Eilendrop

References

External links

1968 films
1968 drama films
1960s French-language films
Films based on works by Stefan Zweig
French drama films
German drama films
Remakes of German films
Pathé films
West German films
1960s French films
1960s German films